Group C of the 2015 Africa Cup of Nations was played from 19 January until 27 January in Equatorial Guinea. The group consisted of Ghana, Algeria, South Africa, and Senegal. Ghana and Algeria advanced as group winners and runners-up respectively, while Senegal and South Africa were eliminated.

Teams

Notes

Standings

In the quarter-finals:
Ghana advanced to play Guinea (runner-up of Group D).
Algeria advanced to play Ivory Coast (winner of Group D).

Matches
All times local, WAT (UTC+1).

Ghana vs Senegal
Ghana took the lead in the 14th minute through a penalty by André Ayew, awarded after Christian Atsu was brought down by Bouna Coundoul. Senegal equalized in the 58th minute as Mame Biram Diouf headed in the rebound after his initial header hit the post, and won the game in the third minute of injury time as Moussa Sow shot home a pass from Diouf.

Algeria vs South Africa
South Africa took the lead in the 51st minute, as Thuso Phala shot home a pass from Sibusiso Vilakazi. They missed the chance to increase the lead four minutes later after Tokelo Rantie's penalty, awarded for a foul on Vilakazi by Aïssa Mandi, hit the bar and went out, and conceded the equalizer in the 67th minute, as Thulani Hlatshwayo headed Yacine Brahimi's cross into his own goal. Algeria took the lead as Faouzi Ghoulam received Sofiane Feghouli's cross, ran into the penalty area and hammered past the goalkeeper, and sealed the win in the 83rd minute, after Ishak Belfodil fed Islam Slimani, whose shot squirmed through the goalkeeper's hands.

Ghana vs Algeria
The only goal was scored in the second minute of second half injury time, as Asamoah Gyan chased down a long pass from Mubarak Wakaso to give Ghana the victory.

South Africa vs Senegal
South Africa took the lead in the 47th minute, as Oupa Manyisa scored from Anele Ngcongca's cross. Senegal equalized in the 60th minute when Kara Mbodj headed in Papakouli Diop's free kick.

South Africa vs Ghana
South Africa took the lead in the 17th minute, as Mandla Masango volleyed in a headed clearance from the Ghana defence from outside the penalty area. Ghana equalized in the 73rd minute, when André Ayew's shot fell to John Boye to score. André Ayew clinched the win for Ghana with a header from a Baba Rahman cross in the 83rd minute, confirming Ghana as group winners, while South Africa were eliminated.

Senegal vs Algeria
Algeria took the lead in the 11th minute, when Madjid Bougherra's long free kick found Riyad Mahrez to score. They sealed the win in the 82nd minute after Nabil Bentaleb received Sofiane Feghouli's pass on the edge of the penalty area and shot home. As a result, Algeria advanced as group runners-up (behind Ghana based on head-to-head record), while Senegal were eliminated.

References

External links
Orange Africa Cup Of Nations, Equatorial Guinea 2015, CAFonline.com

Group C
Ghana at the 2015 Africa Cup of Nations
2014–15 in Algerian football
2014–15 in South African soccer
2015 in Senegalese sport